Magu may refer to:
 Magu, Iran, a village in Kerman Province, Iran
 Magu, Rafsanjan, a village in Kerman Province, Iran
 Magu District of Mwanza Region, Tanzania
 Magu, Tanzania a town in Mwanza Region of Tanzania
 Gilbert "Magu" Luján
 Magu, a Desorden Público band member
 Magu (deity), a legendary Chinese immortal

See also
Magoo (disambiguation)